Iva Tepeshanova (born February 19, 1983, in Sofia) is a Bulgarian rhythmic gymnast.

Tepeshanova competed for Bulgaria in the rhythmic gymnastics individual all-around competition at the 2000 Summer Olympics in Sydney. There she was 15th in the qualification round and did not advance to the final of 10 competitors.

References

External links 
 Iva Tepeshanova at Sports-Reference.com

1983 births
Living people
Bulgarian rhythmic gymnasts
Gymnasts at the 2000 Summer Olympics
Olympic gymnasts of Bulgaria
Gymnasts from Sofia